Now That's What I Call New Wave 80s is a compilation album from the popular Now! series, released in the United States on August 7, 2015 on CD format. The album contains hit new wave songs of the 1980s. It reached No. 106 on the Billboard 200 and No. 16 on the Billboard Top Rock Albums chart.

A Deluxe Edition was also released in a digital-only format, which contains an extra 22 tracks on top of the initial 18, bringing the total number of songs to 40.

Critical reception
Timothy Monger of AllMusic said, "This themed collection from the folks at Now Music features 18 prime cuts of 1980s new wave. [The album] manages to hit on major players like R.E.M., the Cure, the Human League, and Tears for Fears."

In a positive review by Paste Magazine, Ron Hart said of the album: "What makes this physical set so cool are the off-menu choices selected here, be it INXS's early hit “The One Thing” off 1982’s underrated Shabooh Shoobah, choosing the Thompson Twins’ hidden hit “Lies” over “Hold Me Now” and “Mad World” from Tears for Fears’ epic debut LP The Hurting in lieu of the litany of hits from Songs from the Big Chair. And that’s not to mention the incorporation of the fairly deep “Desperate But Not Serious” off his solo debut Friend or Foe for Adam Ant representation. Decisions such as these seem to indicate that NOW That's What I Call New Wave 80s was crafted by the hands of a master of the decade. The '80s new wave sound has made a comeback in a massive way in recent years, and this most exceptional megamix serves as a quality 101 class for any kid looking to dive headfirst into the day glow."

Track listing

Deluxe Edition (includes the above and the following additional tracks)

See also 
 Now That's What I Call the 80s (U.S. series)

References

2015 compilation albums
New wave
Universal Records compilation albums
Sony Music compilation albums
New wave compilation albums